The Citroën Xantia, pronounced "Zan–ti–a" is a large family car (D) produced by the French automaker Citroën, and designed by Bertone. Presented to the press in December 1992, the car was produced between 1992 and 2002 in Europe, with a facelift in the end of 1997.

The Citroën Xantia Activa V6 still holds the record speed through the moose test maneuver, due to its active anti-roll bars. This test is conducted by the magazine Teknikens Värld's, as a test of avoiding a moose in the road. The second place car, Porsche 997 GT3 RS was able to manage . 
	
Citroën produced 1,216,734 Xantias during its nine years of production at the PSA Rennes Plant. 

Production of the Xantia at SAIPA, Tehran Iran from 2001 to 2010 resulted in an undisclosed number of additional units.

History
The Xantia replaced the earlier Citroën BX (which straddled both small and large family car segments), and maintained the high level of popularity of that model, but brought the car more into the mainstream to compete harder with its rivals, such as the Ford Mondeo, Nissan Primera, Rover 600, Toyota Carina E and Opel Vectra/Vauxhall Cavalier.

The car was built from November 1992 to October 2002 in France, totalling almost ten years, including the facelift in December 1997.

It signalled that Citroën had learned from the reception given to the staid Citroën ZX, introduced two years earlier, and criticised by contemporary journalists for its lack of traditional Citroën flair, in engineering and design. Citroën addressed these concerns in the Xantia.

The Xantia also used the traditional Citroën hydropneumatic suspension system, which was pioneered by the older DS. It was initially only available as a hatchback (notchback) (Berline), but an estate (station wagon) (Break) version, built by Heuliez, appeared in September 1995.

Inline with PSA Group policy, the Peugeot 406, launched two years later, used the same floorpan, core structure and engines as the Xantia. The Hydractive suspension system was not carried over, and the 406 utilised a more traditional spring suspension.

Sales in the United Kingdom were strong, and even though it was never able to match the volume of British favourites, such as the Ford Mondeo or Vauxhall Vectra, the car did help Citroën establish a strong foothold in the business car market in the United Kingdom.

Xantia name

The name "Xantia" like some other names on Citroën models before (like Athena or Pallas) is coming from ancient Greek history and mythology.

"Xantia" is derived from Xanthos, mean golden or blond in Greek Language. Xanthos is name of an ancient Lycian city (meaning "golden city") in ancient Lycia region. The name is also known for Xanthian Obelisk, An bilingual Obelisk from Persian Achaemenid Empire era found in ruins of Xanthos city.

Facelifted version for 1998

The facelift in the end of 1997 created Mark 1 and Mark 2 Xantia.

The Mark 1 Xantia was produced between 1993 and 1997 is distinguished by the grille attached to body of car.

The Mark 2 Xantia was produced between 1998 and 2001 is distinguished by grille attached to bonnet of car. It also featured body colored bumpers and a revised dashboard.

Xantia Activa 

The top model in Citroën's Xantia series was the highly engineered Activa. The model was introduced at the end of 1994, and between the spring of 1995 and the autumn of 2001 was built in just over 18,000 copies.

The name refers to the Citroën Activa showcar.
 
The distinguishing feature of the Activa was the ability to drive around curves without any chassis roll.
This technology is more broadly known as active suspension, and the Xantia Activa has exceptional road holding comparable to true sports cars.

This lack of roll is achieved by active chassis intervention. In addition to Hydractive II, Activa also had undercarriage stabilization (AFS), in French SC.CAR = Systeme Citroën de Contrôle Actif du Roulis, which was the first standard-fitted, active cross-stabilizer in automobile construction. With this system, the lateral inclination could be reduced to a minimum (−0.2 ° to 1 °) by means of mechanical control with hydraulic cylinders acting on the cross-stabilizer bars. This technique enabled (according to the manufacturer's specifications) with optimal road grip transverse accelerations of up to 1.2 g and despite this also offered an above-average high suspension comfort and thus a safer road position. Compared to the standard models, Activa had seats with reinforced side rails, which on the first series (X1) were also pneumatically adjustable.

Activa active anti roll bars 
In 1994, the Activa technology was introduced, which is an extension to the Hydractive II suspension, where two additional spheres and two hydraulic cylinders are used together with computer control to eliminate body roll completely.

Moose test
The Citroën Xantia V6 Activa still holds the record speed through the moose test maneuver, due to its active anti-roll bars. This test is conducted by the magazine Teknikens Värld's, as a test of avoiding a moose in the road. The second place car, a Nissan Qashqai DIG-T 160 Acenta was able to manage ).

A TikTok video compared a 1996 Citroen Xantia to a 2021 BMW M4 Competition in terms of moose test. Xantia was able to pass through the object at 73km/h without flipping a single traffic cone, whereas the M4 had to slow down to 29km/h while it flipped 3 traffic cones during the moose test.

Detailed description for AFS / SC.CAR

Both (relatively thick) transverse stabilizers (front 28 mm, rear 25 mm dimensions) were located diagonally (front left and rear right), and were connected to the wheel joints by a differential hydraulic cylinder.

These cylinders were connected to a control valve, which was operated directly by the front cross joints with connecting rods over a spring-handle mechanism. The occurring rolling moment (side slope) had the opposite effect on the cross joints - one wheel springs in and the other out. Thereby, the control valve (inclination corrector) was pulled out / pushed in by means of the connecting rods in a direction out of its rest position (straight ahead), whereby a pressure proportional to the rolling moment was formed in the hydraulic cylinders.

Thereby the hydraulic cylinders changed position and acted against the bias of the cross stabilizer. They "pressed" the body over the cross-stabilizer bars against the rolling torque further horizontally, enabling cornering with up to 0.6g transverse acceleration with −0.2 to 0.5° lateral inclination. From 0.6g transverse acceleration, the cylinders returned to the starting position, from which the Xantia Activa tilted up to 1° in the curve until the curve limit area was reached, which corresponded to the value of a sports car with a correspondingly tighter tuning.

As these active roller stabilizers worked independently of the Hydractive II undercarriage, the suspension could be almost completely maintained even at extreme cornering, giving a significantly better road position in these situations than with conventional wheel suspensions. When driving straight ahead, a solenoid valve was operated by the control unit for the Hydractive suspension, which connected an additional spring ball in the hydraulic control circuit of the cylinder. Thereby, the stiffness of the tightly tuned stabilizer bars could be minimized "virtually" by gas filling the spring ball to reduce the movements and increase the comfort. Likewise, they had a damping effect on the control circuit, so that there were no undesired oscillations during straight-ahead driving due to suspension-related, short-term operation of the inclination corrector.

Activa engines
Xantia Activa was available with the following engines (not all engines were necessarily available in all countries):

Petrol: 2.0i 16V 97 kW (132 hp), 2.0i 16V 110 kW (150 hp), 2.0i Turbo CT 108 kW (147 hp) and 3.0i V6 140 kW (190 hp).
Diesel: 2.1 Turbo D12 80 kW (109 hp) and 2.0 HDi 80 kW (109 hp).
Equipment
Activa could be recognized by the standard-fitted rear spoiler, the Venise alloy wheels, the car-painted bumpers (on the first series), the black roof canopy (depending on the year of construction), special front seats with distinctive side members and the Activa logo instead of engine displacement badge.

Hydraulic suspension
The Xantia was the last Citroën to use the green fluid, LHM (Liquide Hydraulique Minéral), a mineral oil. Later cars, such as the C5, used LDS instead.

The Xantia also was the last Citroën vehicle to use a common hydraulic circuit for suspension, brakes and steering like the pioneering Citroën DS.

The Xantia had several variants of the Hydraulic system:

 Hydropneumatic suspension (5 spheres)
 Hydractive 2 suspension (7 spheres)
 Hydropneumatic (anti-sink) suspension (6 spheres)
 Hydractive 2 (anti-sink) suspension (8 spheres)
 Activa active suspension SC.CAR (10 spheres)

Hydractive 

From an engineering perspective, the Xantia's biggest advance was the suspension.  From launch, the more expensive models were available with an enhanced version of the XM's Hydractive, Hydractive II or H2, computer controlled version of the hydropneumatic self-leveling suspension.

This used extra suspension spheres to allow a soft ride in normal conditions, but taut body control during hard braking, acceleration or cornering.

These models feature an innovation first seen on the ZX, and then subsequently fitted to the facelifted XM, a programmed self steer rear axle.  On sweeping curves and tight bends alike, the rear wheels turn in line with the front wheels, sharpening responses and adding to driver pleasure.

Engines
Power came from the familiar PSA XU series petrol engines, this time in 1.6, 1.8 and 2.0 displacements, a 2.0 16 valve version for the Xantia VSX, a turbocharged 2.0 engine, from 1995 onwards, a 1.8 16 valve and a 2.0 16 valve engine. In 1997, a 3.0 V6 engine was offered as top-of-the-line. This engine was also offered with the Activa suspension system, a rare version with less than 2600 built.

The popular XUD turbodiesel units in 1.9 (turbocharged: , low pressure turbo: , or not: 71 hp) displacement proved to be the best selling engine.

In 1998, PSA introduced the HDi direct injection turbodiesel (in two versions: , and intercooled 109 PS).

United Kingdom models of the Activa came fitted with a XU10 2 litre turbocharged engine also fitted to the Citroën XM 2.0CT and Peugeot 605 SRi. It produced 150 bhp and 171 lb ft of torque and was a 'low-blow' type for smooth power delivery rather than outright bhp.

Iranian production

Xantia was produced in Iran from 2001 to 2010 in four different models.
All models produced in Iran were produced only with a five-speed manual gearbox and a five-door liftback body. The Xantia was the first Citroën produced by SAIPA since the Citroën Dyane Jian (1967-1980).

The February 18, 2000 contract, that renewed the relationship, called for SAIPA to serve as a center for exporting Xantia to the Middle East, Central Asia, Russia and Ukraine.  In 2001, some 9,500 out of a total 12,000 cars to be made in Iran, were expected to be sent abroad for sale. At least 40% of parts would be made in Iran.

According to SAIPA, Xantia was one of the best products produced in the history of car making in Iran. Production ended in 2010 due to the lack of spare parts from France.

Production totals
Actual production totals for the 10 years of Xantia in Iran appear unavailable.

Iranian models
Xantia 1800 Superlux: This model is based on the French model 1.8i16V SX with the removal of equipment such as sunroof, rear wing, body-colored flaps, aluminum rims, cruise control and removal of a number of electronic car alarm sensors and change the car audio system.

Xantia 2000 X: This model is based on the French 2.0i16V SX model with the removal of equipment such as front passenger airbags and side airbags, ABS anti-lock brakes, sunroof, rear wing, body-colored flaps, front fenders, cruise control and removal of a number of sensors. Electronic car alarm and car sound system change were produced.

Xantia 2000 SX: This model is based on the French 2.0i16V SX model with the removal of equipment such as side airbags, sunroof, rear wing, body-colored flaps, cruise control and removal of a number of electronic car alarm sensors and car audio system change.

Xantia Facelift or Xantia 2: Xantia Facelift was similar to the SX 2000 model in terms of engine, gearbox and equipment, with the difference that the front part and the rear bumper of the car were changed by Saipa's designers and the car was so-called facelifted.

Chinese production 

The Citroën Xantia, along with the Citroën XM were assembled by the firm of CKD in Huizhou, Guangdong province. This venture lasted for only two years from 1996 to 1997, and production numbers were extremely low. The cars were imported to China more or less fully assembled with only minor additions done in China as a way to avoid the high import tariffs on cars that existed at the time. Both cars were badged as XM.

The vehicles full name was Fengshen Xietuolong XM.

Sales and production

References

Xantia
Front-wheel-drive vehicles
Mid-size cars
Hatchbacks
Station wagons
2000s cars
Bertone vehicles
Cars introduced in 1993